Social Work Research is a quarterly peer-reviewed academic journal covering social work. It was established in 1977 as Social Work Research and Abstracts, and in 1995, this split into two separate journals: Social Work Research and Social Work Abstracts. It is published by Oxford University Press as part of their partnership with the National Association of Social Workers through the latter's NASW Press. The editor-in-chief is James Herbert Williams (Arizona State University). According to the Journal Citation Reports, the journal has a 2016 impact factor of 1.211.

References

External links

Oxford University Press academic journals
Social work journals
Publications established in 1977
Quarterly journals
Academic journals published by learned and professional societies of the United States